Starmania may refer to:

 Starmania (musical), a French/Québécois rock opera, 1976
 Starmania (TV series), an Austrian TV series